Jane S. Thornton is a Canadian Clinician Scientist, Olympic rower and international advocate for physical activity. She is the Canada Research Chair in Injury Prevention and Physical Activity for Health at the University of Western Ontario. She was born in Fredericton, New Brunswick.

She won a gold medal at the 2006 World Rowing Championships in the women's coxless pairs with Darcy Marquardt. She finished in fourth place at the Beijing 2008 Summer Olympics in the women's eights with Ashley Brzozowicz, Darcy Marquardt, Buffy-Lynne Williams, Sarah Bonikowsky, Romina Stefancic, Andréanne Morin, Heather Mandoli and cox Lesley Thompson-Willie.

Thornton earned a BSc, MSc and Ph.D. in Kinesiology and Sport Medicine from the University of Western Ontario before attending medical school at the University of Toronto, where she added an MD to her list of academic credentials. Following medical school, she undertook a year of medical residency abroad in Switzerland and gained valuable international experience to fuel her passion for the use of physical activity for prevention and treatment of chronic disease.

International rowing 

From 2001 to 2011, Thornton competed as a member of Canada's National Rowing Team.

One of her chief accomplishments during this time was an undefeated international season in the Women's Pair with partner Darcy Marquardt that culminated in victory at the 2006 World Rowing Championships at Eton-Dorney, UK. The duo qualified the Women's Pair for the Beijing 2008 Olympics the following year at the 2007 World Rowing Championships.

In the spring of 2008, Thornton was assigned to stroke the Women's Eight at the final Olympic qualification regatta where the crew secured a berth for the Games. That crew went on to come fourth in Beijing by the narrowest of margins (just 0.72 seconds separated 2nd place from 4th).

Other notable accomplishments representing Canada during this period include three Canadian National Championship titles in the Women's Pair, three World Cup podium performances in the Women's Pair and Eight, Commonwealth Rowing Championship wins in the Women's Single and Q­ruple Sculls and gold at the World University Rowing Championships in the Women's Single and Double Sculls.

In 2006 Thornton and Marquardt were Canadian Sports Awards finalist in the "Partners of the Year" category. Thornton was named Honorary Team Captain for Team New Brunswick at the 2009 Canada Summer Games. In 2010, she was further honoured as a torchbearer in the Olympic Torch Relay during the lead up to the 2010 Vancouver Winter Olympics.

Rowing Canada has recognised Thornton with three separate awards: the Rowing Canada Aviron Award of Merit (the highest award conferred by Rowing Canada) "in recognition of exceptional service to rowing as a competitive athlete"; the Rowing Canada Aviron Centennial Medal for outstanding contribution to Canadian rowing; and the Rowing Canada Aviron International Achievement Award.

Social responsibility 

In 2015, Thornton was awarded the AthletesCAN Athlete Social Responsibility Award for her efforts to provide mentorship, inspiration and leadership to developing athletes within Canada's rowing community as well as her contributions to push forward the promotion and recognition of athlete social responsibility internationally.

Thornton has additionally been involved as an Athlete Ambassador at Right to Play Canada, in which capacity she travelled to Uganda in 2009.

International experience 

During the course of her education and athletic pursuits, Thornton sought out many international experiences to complement her research, including further medical training in six different countries.

She has developed educational resources and medical curricula in Switzerland, Luxembourg, the United Kingdom, and Canada and lectures on the topic internationally.

Selected publications 

Thornton has contributed to a number of publications in leading medical journals including the following:

References

Social media

External links 
 Bio page Fowler Kennedy Sport Medicine Clinic
 Bio page Schulich School of Medicine and Dentistry, Western University
 Profile at the Canadian Olympic Committee
 Profile at Rowing Canada
 Canadian Medical Association: Demand A Plan

1978 births
Canadian female rowers
Olympic rowers of Canada
Sportspeople from Fredericton
Rowers at the 2008 Summer Olympics
World Rowing Championships medalists for Canada
Living people
University of Western Ontario alumni
University of Toronto alumni
Canadian women scientists
Canadian women physicians